Songsak is one of the 60 Legislative Assembly constituencies of Meghalaya state in India. It is part of East Garo Hills district and is reserved for candidates belonging to the Scheduled Tribes. It falls under Tura Lok Sabha constituency.

Members of the Legislative Assembly
Source:

|-style="background:#E9E9E9;"
!Year
!colspan="2" align="center"|Party
!align="center" |MLA
!Votes 
|-
|1972
|bgcolor="#CEF2E0"|
|align="left"| All Party Hill Leaders Conference
|align="left"| Elwin Sangma
|819
|-
|1975*
|bgcolor="#CEF2E0"|
|align="left"| All Party Hill Leaders Conference
|align="left"| Miriam D. Shira
|2,268
|-
|1978
|bgcolor="#DDDDDD"|
|align="left"| Independent
|align="left"| Miriam D. Shira
|1,156
|-
|1983
|bgcolor="#00FFFF"|
|align="left"| Indian National Congress
|align="left"| Elwin Sangma
|2,190
|-
|1988
|bgcolor="#CEF2E0"|
|align="left"| Hill People's Union
|align="left"| Lehinson Sangma 
|3,047
|-
|1993
|bgcolor="#00FFFF"|
|align="left"| Indian National Congress
|align="left"| Tonsing N. Marak
|5,105
|-
|1998 
|bgcolor="#00FFFF"|
|align="left"| Indian National Congress
|align="left"| Tonsing N. Marak
|4,089
|-
|2003
|bgcolor="#CEF2E0"|
|align="left"| United Democratic Party
|align="left"| Heltone N. Marak
|4,875
|-
|2005*
|bgcolor="#00FFFF"|
|align="left"| Indian National Congress
|align="left"| Tonsing N. Marak
|3,890
|-
|2008
|bgcolor="#00B2B2"|
|align="left"| Nationalist Congress Party
|align="left"| Nihim D. Shira
|5,687
|-
|2013
|bgcolor="#DB7093"|
|align="left"| National People's Party
|align="left"| Nihim D. Shira
|6,697
|-
|2018
|bgcolor="#00FFFF"|
|align="left"| Indian National Congress
|align="left"| Mukul Sangma
|10,274  
|-
|2021
|bgcolor=#20C646|
|align="left"| All India Trinamool Congress
|align="left"| Mukul Sangma
|10,274  
|}
* Bye-election

Election results

2023

2018

See also
 Songsak
 East Garo Hills district
 Tura (Lok Sabha constituency)

References

Assembly constituencies of Meghalaya
East Garo Hills district